Žalica is a surname. Notable people with the surname include:

 (born 1959), Bosnian writer and poet
Jasna Žalica (born 1968), Bosnian actress
Pjer Žalica (born 1964), Bosnian film director, screenwriter, and professor